Anke is a German television series produced from 1999 to 2001. Anke Engelke stars in the title role as a fictitious talk show anchor who is successful on camera in solving other people's problems, while being unsuccessful with her own private life.

See also
List of German television series

External links
 

German comedy television series
2000 German television series debuts
2001 German television series endings
German-language television shows
Sat.1 original programming